Josiah Bowers French (December 13, 1799 – August 21, 1876) was a bank president who served as the  seventh mayor of Lowell, Massachusetts.

Family life

French married Mary Anne Stevens of Billerica, Massachusetts, on April 6, 1823; they had nine children: Mary Ann French, born September 19, 1823, Josiah Stevens French born September 30, 1825, Harriet Stevens French  born August 27, 1827, Josiah Bowers French born January 8, 1830, Samuel Lawrence French born September 25, 1832, Luther Bartlett French  born October 25, 1834, Sarah Josephine French  born March 3, 1838, Catherine Isabella French born December 20, 1840, and Francis Maria French born April 20, 1843.

Mayor of Lowell

Josiah Bowers French was elected mayor of Lowell in 1848, he was re-elected mayor in December 1849.

References

1799 births
1876 deaths
American bank presidents
Mayors of Lowell, Massachusetts
19th-century American politicians
19th-century American businesspeople